Lidiya Evgenevna Krylova (born 12 March 1951) is a Russian rower who competed for the Soviet Union in the 1976 Summer Olympics.

In 1976 she was the coxswain of the Soviet boat which won the bronze medal in the coxed fours event.

External links
 profile

1951 births
Living people
Russian female rowers
Soviet female rowers
Coxswains (rowing)
Olympic rowers of the Soviet Union
Rowers at the 1976 Summer Olympics
Olympic bronze medalists for the Soviet Union
Olympic medalists in rowing
Medalists at the 1976 Summer Olympics